Theratil Rajiv Ouseph (born 30 August 1986) is a former badminton player from England who represented both England and Great Britain in the international tournaments. Ouseph was the European Champion, winning in 2017.

Ouseph was born and brought up in London and is of Indian descent.

Career 
Ouseph has won the men's singles titles at the National Championships, seven times in a row from 2008 to 2014, the first player to do so. Ouseph became the first player to win more than four consecutive national singles titles since Darren Hall (1988–1991).

In the junior English national circuit, he has won all the singles titles from the ages of U–13 to U–19. In the European tournaments, he has won the U–19 Danish titles in singles and mixed doubles and the German Junior title in singles. His other notable achievements are winning the European Junior Championship in 2005, the first Englishman to win the title in twenty years.

In 2009, he won the Canadian International, Le Volant d'Or de Toulouse, Scottish Open, Irish Open and went on to win the 2009 European Circuit Finals.

He won his first senior cap for England at the age of nineteen in the Thomas Cup. He also represented England in the Sudirman Cup where he was the youngest player in the English team. Ouseph was selected as the number one singles player for the English team in the Thomas Cup qualifiers which was held in Poland in February 2010.

Ouseph was ranked as world number 11 in November 2010, after winning the U.S. Open men's singles title and winning the bronze medal in the men's singles in the European Championships. Later that year he won a silver medal at the 2010 Commonwealth Games in the men's singles, as well as the bronze medal in the mixed team event.

In 2014, Ouseph took silver at the European Championships after losing to top seed Jan Ø. Jørgensen of Denmark in Kazan, Russia.

Representing Great Britain at the 2016 Summer Olympics in the men's singles event, he was defeated by bronze medalist Viktor Axelsen from Denmark in quarter finals.

Achievements

Commonwealth Games 
Men's singles

European Championships 
Men's singles

European Junior Championships 
Boys' singles

BWF World Tour 
The BWF World Tour, which was announced on 19 March 2017 and implemented in 2018, is a series of elite badminton tournaments sanctioned by the Badminton World Federation (BWF). The BWF World Tours are divided into levels of World Tour Finals, Super 1000, Super 750, Super 500, Super 300 (part of the HSBC World Tour), and the BWF Tour Super 100.

Men's singles

BWF Grand Prix 
The BWF Grand Prix had two levels, the BWF Grand Prix and Grand Prix Gold. It was a series of badminton tournaments sanctioned by the Badminton World Federation (BWF) which was held from 2007 to 2017.

Men's singles

  BWF Grand Prix Gold tournament
  BWF Grand Prix tournament

BWF International Challenge/Series 
Men's singles

  BWF International Challenge tournament
  BWF International Series tournament

National titles 
 2005 English U–19 Nationals men's singles Winner
 2008 English Nationals men's singles winner
 2009 English Nationals men's singles winner
 2010 English Nationals men's singles winner
 2011 English Nationals men's singles winner
 2012 English Nationals men's singles winner
 2013 English Nationals men's singles winner
 2014 English Nationals men's singles winner
 2016 English Nationals men's singles winner

Personal life 
Ouseph took up badminton at the age of 9, encouraged by the rest of his family who also played badminton.  Although he began a degree in Media at Loughborough University, he chose to give it up in favour of his badminton career.

References

External links 

 
 
 
 

1986 births
Living people
People from Hounslow
English people of Indian descent
English male badminton players
Alumni of Loughborough University
Badminton players at the 2012 Summer Olympics
Badminton players at the 2016 Summer Olympics
Olympic badminton players of Great Britain
Badminton players at the 2010 Commonwealth Games
Badminton players at the 2014 Commonwealth Games
Badminton players at the 2018 Commonwealth Games
Commonwealth Games silver medallists for England
Commonwealth Games bronze medallists for England
Commonwealth Games medallists in badminton
Medallists at the 2010 Commonwealth Games
Medallists at the 2014 Commonwealth Games
Medallists at the 2018 Commonwealth Games